Quark/ was an American anthology book series devoted to avant-garde science fiction and related material, edited by writer and critic Samuel R. Delany and poet and editor Marilyn Hacker; four volumes were published in 1970 and 1971.  The editors, once married, were among the foremost homosexual activist/writers in the following decades.

Quark/1 
The first volume of Quark/ was published in 1970 through the Paperback Library and featured the following: 

 Editorial, by Samuel R. Delany & Marilyn Hacker
 "The Cliff Climbers", by R. A. Lafferty
 "The Sound of Muzak", by Gardner R. Dozois
 "A Trip to the Head", by Ursula K. Le Guin
 "Let Us Quickly Hasten to the Gate of Ivory", by Thomas M. Disch
 "Inalienable Rite", by Gregory Benford
 "Orion", by George Stanley
 "The View from This Window", by Joanna Russ
 "Gone Are the Lupo", by H. B. Hickey
 "Fire Storm", by Christopher Priest
 "Getting to Know You", by Link
 "Dogman of Islington", by Hilary Bailey
 "Shades", by Sandy Boucher
 Twelve Ancillary Approximations for the Quark/ Cover Called Appomattox, by Russell FitzGerald
 "Carthing", by A. E. van Vogt
 "Daughter of Roses", by Helen Adam
 "Adrift on the Freeway", by Edward Bryant
 "My Father’s Guest", by Joan Bernott
 Critical Methods: Speculative Fiction, by Samuel R. Delany
 "Ramona, Come Softly", by Gordon Eklund
 Six Drawings, by Stephen Gilden
 Contributors’ Notes

Quark/2 
The second volume of Quark/ was published in 1971 through the Paperback Library  and featured the following: 

 Introduction, by Samuel R. Delany & Marilyn Hacker
 "The Interstate", by John Sladek
 "A Possible Episode in the Picaresque Adventures of Mr. J.H.B. Monstrosee", by Carol Emshwiller
 "Trojak", by Marek Obtulowicz
 "Gold, Black, and Silver", by Fritz Leiber
 "Mensuration", by James Sallis
 Six Drawings, by Roger Penney
 "The Voice of the Sonar in My Vermiform Appendix", by Philip José Farmer
 "The Way Home", by Joan Bernott
 "Among the Dead", by Edward Bryant
 "The Last Supper", by Russell FitzGerald
 "The Village", by Leland Stoney
 "Arpad", by Alexei Panshin
 "Bitching It", by Sonya Dorman
 Five Drawings, by Nemi Frost
 "Et in Arcadia Ego", by Thomas M. Disch
 "Landscape for Insurrection", by Marilyn Hacker
 "The People of Prashad", by James Keilty
 "The Inception of the Epoch of Mrs. Bedonebyasyoudid", by John Brunner
 "The Electric Neon Mermaid", by Laurence Yep

Quark/3 
The third volume of Quark/ was published in 1971 through the Paperback Library  and featured the following: 

 Continuous Landscape, by Donald Simpson
 Foreword, by Samuel R. Delany & Marilyn Hacker
 Continuous Landscape, by Donald Simpson
 "Encased in Ancient Rind", by R. A. Lafferty
 "Home Again, Home Again", by Gordon Eklund
 Continuous Landscape, by Donald Simpson
 "Dog in a Fisherman’s Net", by Samuel R. Delany
 Six Drawings, by Robert Lavigne
 "The Zanzibar Cat", by Joanna Russ
 "Field", by James Sallis
 "Vanishing Points", by Sonya Dorman
 "Where Have You Been, Billy Boy, Billy Boy?", by Kate Wilhelm
 "Brave Salt", by Richard Hill
 "Nature Boy", by Josephine Saxton
 Continuous Landscape, by Donald Simpson
 "Balls: A Meditation at the Graveside", by Virginia Kidd
 "Ring of Pain", by M. John Harrison
 "To the Child Whose Birth Will Change the Way the Universe Works", by George Stanley
 Continuous Landscape, by Donald Simpson
 "A Sexual Song", by Tom Veitch
 "Twenty-Four Letters from Under the Earth", by Hilary Bailey
 Six More Drawings, by Robert Lavigne
 "The Coded Sun Game", by Brian Vickers
 Continuous Landscape, by Donald Simpson
 Contributors’ Notes

Quark/4 
The fourth volume of Quark/ was published in 1971 through the Paperback Library  and featured the following: 

 On Speculative Fiction, by Samuel R. Delany & Marilyn Hacker
 "Basileikon: Summe", by Avram Davidson
 "Voortrekker", by Michael Moorcock
 "Brass and Gold, or Horse and Zeppelin in Beverly Hills", by Philip José Farmer
 "The Song of Passing", by Marco Cacchioni
 "Norman Vs. America", by Charles Platt
 "The True Reason for the Dreadful Death of Mr. Rex Arundel", by Helen Adam
 "Acid Soap Opera", by Gail Madonia
 "Bodies", by Thomas M. Disch
 "Nightsong", by Marilyn Hacker
 "Cages", by Vonda N. McIntyre
 "Man of Letters", by Marek Obtulowicz
 "The Fourth Profession", by Larry Niven
 Twelve Drawings, by Olivier Olivier
 from The Day, by Stan Persky

Footnotes

External links

Science fiction anthology series